The Abarth 2000 Pininfarina Scorpio is a mid-engined prototype sports car, designed by legendary Italian design company Pininfarina, and developed and built by Abarth, in 1969. One prototype vehicle was built, and was displayed at the Brussels Motor Show in 1969.

References 

Abarth vehicles
Cars of Italy
Mid-engined cars
Pininfarina vehicles